The Acco Super Bulldozer is the largest and most powerful tracked bulldozer ever made. It was built in Portogruaro in northern Italy by the Umberto Acco company. The Acco super bulldozer was constructed mainly of Caterpillar parts; however, many other components were specially adapted. The dozer blade, for example, is bigger than anything Caterpillar has ever made.

This bulldozer was initially built to be exported to Libya in the early 1980s to help in land development. As the Leader of Libya, Colonel Gaddafi, was heavily involved with international terrorism at that time, the United States imposed a trade embargo on that country in 1986. As a direct consequence of these trade restrictions, the completed Acco Dozer was never shipped to its intended destination. This bulldozer has never been put to any operational use and was put into storage where it was built.

Acco ceased to exist when its founder Umberto Acco died and his son died shortly afterward. They left no legacy for managing the Acco company. Beginning in 2008, Acco's former main and secondary shops slowly turned into a dumping ground for surplus earth moving machinery, including the super bulldozer and its brother, a 200-ton super grader.

By the end of May 2012 the dozer had been moved away from the abandoned Acco facility and is now safely stored at a gardening company in the same town, to be preserved and eventually put on display. The Acco Superdozer moved under its own power onto the trailer that took it to the new location.

References

Bulldozers with powerplants larger than 500kW
Bulldozers over 100 tonne